Rodney St.Tarek Elsetouhi''' (born February 2, 1977, in Egypt) is an IFBB Pro Bodybuilder from Egypt. He now lives in United Arab Emirates, and competes internationally. He is known as a bodybuilding model and has appeared several times on MuscleGallery. As of 2008 he qualified and received his IFBB Pro Card.

Stats 
Age : 42

Height : 5'10"

Off Season Weight : 330

Competition Weight : 290 lbs.

Contest results

IFBB Amateur Contests

1994 Juniors World Championship in Izmir, 80 kg, 5th place
1996 Juniors World Championship in Kattowitz/Polen, 80 kg, 2nd place
1997 Arab Bodybuilding Championship, Junior Class, 80 kg, 1st Place
1997 Mediterranean Championship, 90 kg, 5th Place
1998 Mediterranean Championship, 90 kg+, 6th Place
1999 Int. African Bodybuilding Championship, Heavyweight Class, 1st Place
2000 Int. German Championship in Koblenz, 90 kg+, 5th Place
2002 World Championship in Cairo, 90 kg+, 11th Place
2003 Mediterranean Championship in Egypt, Heavyweight over 90 kg, 1st Place
2003 Int. German Championship, 90 kg+, 1st Place and Overall Winner
2004 Guestposer at the Bavarian Championships
2004 Overall winner at the Championships of Hessen and Rheinland-Pfalz – 1st Place
2004 Winner at the 2nd International Heavy Weight Cup – 1st Place
2004 International Amateur Grand Prix in Butzbach/Germany, Overall Winner – 1st Place
2004 EM-Qualifikation for Budapest in Butzbach/Germany, Winner
2004 European Championships, Heavyweight – 5th Place
2005 BodyXTreme Invitational – 1st Place and Overall Winner
2005 IFBB Int. German Championship, 90 kg+, 1st Place + Overall Winner
2008 IFBB Arnold Classic-Amateur, Super Heavyweight – 1st Place + Overal Winner

IFBB Professional Contests

2008 IFBB New York Men's Pro, Super Heavyweight – 12th Place
2008 IFBB Europa Super Show, Super Heavyweight – 5th Place
2008 IFBB Tampa Pro, Super Heavyweight – 6th Place
2008 IFBB Atlantic City Men's Pro, Super Heavyweight 10th Place
2009 IFBB New York Men's Pro, Super Heavyweight – 6th Place
2009 IFBB Tampa Pro, Super Heavyweight – 6th Place
2009 IFBB Europa Super Show Pro, Super Heavyweight – 8th Place

References

External links
 Gallery of Tarek Elsetouhi

1977 births
Egyptian bodybuilders
Professional bodybuilders
Living people